Asian Broadcasting Network (M) Sdn Bhd, DBA ABNxcess, was the sole digital cable television operator in Malaysia, launched on 8 June 2013. The company offers cable television services via the cable network which has been in operation since 2012.

ABNxcess is owned and operated by Asian Broadcasting Network (M) Sdn Bhd, a wholly owned subsidiary of The ABN Media Group. It has operations at Pusat Perniagaan Suria Puchong located in Puchong, Selangor, Malaysia. Currently, the company has ceased its operations.

Set-top boxes

HD Set-top Box (HD) [Model: HMC3000, Motorola]

Features
  Decoding of high definition standards for MPEG2, MPEG4, H.264 broadcast
  Supports applications and graphics
  High speed connectivity for STB peripherals such as Flash Drives, external HDDs and so on
  HDMI video output up to 1920×1080 px (1080p)

Financial crisis
For the financial year of 2013, ABNxcess accumulated losses stood at RM36.2mil, including a loss of RM30.7mil for the year. The company also has not filed its financial results for the last two years. ABNxcess has loan facilities totalling RM465 million.

See also
 Television in Malaysia
 Digital television in Malaysia

References

2013 establishments in Malaysia
2016 disestablishments in Malaysia
Television in Malaysia
Television channels and stations established in 2013
Television channels and stations disestablished in 2016
Cable television companies